José Luis Villanueva Orihuela (born 28 April 1965) is a Spanish former racing cyclist. He rode in the 1991 Tour de France.

References

External links
 

1965 births
Living people
Spanish male cyclists
Place of birth missing (living people)
Sportspeople from Jerez de la Frontera
Cyclists from Andalusia